The 1979 Giro d'Italia was the 62nd edition of the Giro d'Italia, one of cycling's Grand Tours. The Giro began with a prologue individual time trial in Florence on 17 May, and Stage 10 occurred on 27 May with an individual time trial from Lerici. The race finished in Milan on 6 June.

Stage 10
27 May 1979 — Lerici to Portovenere,  (ITT)

Stage 11
28 May 1979 — La Spezia to Voghera,

Stage 12
29 May 1979 — Alessandria to Saint-Vincent,

Stage 13
30 May 1979 — Aosta to Meda,

Stage 14
31 May 1979 — Meda to Bosco Chiesanuova,

Stage 15
1 June 1979 — Verona to Treviso,

Stage 16
2 June 1979 — Treviso to Pieve di Cadore,

Rest day
3 June 1979

Stage 17
4 June 1979 — Pieve di Cadore to Trento,

Stage 18
5 June 1979 — Trento to Barzio,

Stage 19
6 June 1979 — Cesano Maderno to Milan,  (ITT)

References

1979 Giro d'Italia
Giro d'Italia stages